This is a list of towns and villages in the Inverclyde council area of Scotland.

Bogston
Gourock
Greenock
Inverkip
Kilmacolm
Kip
Port Glasgow
Quarrier's Village
Wemyss Bay
Woodhall

See also
List of places in Scotland

Inverclyde
Geography of Inverclyde
Lists of places in Scotland
Populated places in Scotland